Robert William Strong Sr. (March 12, 1890 – October 16, 1975) was an American brigadier general.

Biography

Robert William Strong was born in Kingsville, Ohio on March 12, 1890 and raised in Painesville, Ohio. After attending the Case Institute of Technology for two years, he entered the United States Military Academy at West Point in June 1911. Strong was a member of the class the stars fell on at West Point in June 1915, graduating into the 2nd Cavalry as a Second Lieutenant. While a student, he participated in baseball, ice hockey and polo. Strong played goaltender for the hockey squad and served as team captain during his senior year.

Strong served as a Major of field artillery during World War I, and served as Chief of Staff of the United States Army Forces in North Africa during World War II. He graduated from the Command and General Staff School at Fort Leavenworth in June 1928, the École d'Application de Cavalerie at Saumur, France in September 1929 and the Army War College at Washington Barracks in June 1934. Strong retired on March 31, 1950.

After retirement, Strong and his wife spent their winters in Tucson, Arizona and their summers in western Quebec. He died in Tucson on October 16, 1975, and was buried at West Point Cemetery.

Strong's son, Robert William Strong Jr., became a major general, serving as chief of staff for the Eighth Air Force. Another son, First Lieutenant Gordon Malin Strong, was killed in the Korean War in 1950.

Notes

References

External links
Generals of World War II

1890 births
1975 deaths
People from Kingsville, Ohio
People from Painesville, Ohio
Case Western Reserve University alumni
American ice hockey goaltenders
Army Black Knights men's ice hockey players
United States Military Academy alumni
Graduates of the United States Military Academy Class of 1915
Military personnel from Ohio
United States Army personnel of World War I
United States Army Command and General Staff College alumni
United States Army War College alumni
United States Army generals of World War II
Recipients of the Legion of Merit
United States Army generals
Military personnel from Tucson, Arizona
Burials at West Point Cemetery